Peter Campbell Craigie (18 August 1938 – 26 September 1985) was a British biblical scholar.

Craigie was born in Lancaster and grew up in Edinburgh. He studied successively at the Edinburgh Academy, the Prairie College in Alberta, New College at the University of Edinburgh, St. John's College at the University of Durham, the University of Aberdeen, and McMaster University. He then taught at Carleton University, McMaster University, and the University of Calgary. He died as the result of a car crash in 1985.

Craigie wrote commentaries on Deuteronomy, Ezekiel, the Twelve Prophets, and Psalms 1 – 50. He referred to his approach as "theological-historical" or "theological-scientific". Lyle Eslinger notes that Craigie's approach was "a melding of conservative theological interests and assumptions with the scientific methods of biblical criticism." Tremper Longman describes him as being "among the best of recent evangelical interpreters" as well as "an astute theologian and philologist".

In 1988, a Festschrift was published in his honour. Ascribe to the Lord: Biblical and Other Studies in Memory of Peter C. Craigie included contributions from R. K. Harrison, Kenneth Kitchen, Alan Millard, and Robert Polzin. The Canadian Society of Biblical Studies sponsors the biannual Craigie Lecture in his memory.

Works

Books

Articles

Festschrift

References

External links
 Bibliography of Peter C. Craigie
 Biography

1938 births
1985 deaths
Road incident deaths in Canada
People from Lancaster, Lancashire
People educated at Edinburgh Academy
Alumni of the University of Edinburgh
Alumni of the University of Aberdeen
McMaster University alumni
Academic staff of McMaster University
Academic staff of Carleton University
Academic staff of the University of Calgary
British biblical scholars
Old Testament scholars
Bible commentators
Accidental deaths in Alberta
Evangelical Anglican biblical scholars
Alumni of St John's College, Durham